Robe is a town and fishing port located in the Limestone Coast of South Australia. The town's distinctive combination of historical buildings, ocean, fishing fleets, lakes and dense bush is widely appreciated. Robe lies on the southern shore of Guichen Bay, just off the Princes Highway. Robe is the main town in the District Council of Robe local government area. It is in the state electorate of MacKillop and the federal Division of Barker.

History

Aboriginal use

European use
Robe, one of the oldest towns in South Australia, was founded by the colonial government as a seaport, administrative centre and village just ten years after the Province of South Australia was established.

Robe was named after the fourth Governor of South Australia, Major Frederick Robe, who chose the site as a port in 1845. The town was proclaimed as a port in 1847. It became South Australia's second-busiest (after Port Adelaide) international port in the 1850s. Robe's trade was drawn from a large hinterland that extended into western Victoria, and many roadside inns were built to cater for the bullock teamsters bringing down the wool, including the 'Bush Inn' still standing on the outskirts of Robe. Exports included horses and sheep skins and wool. The Customs House has been listed on the South Australian Heritage Register since 1980. A stone obelisk was built on Cape Dombey in 1852 to help ships navigate safely into the bay. Even so, there have been a number of shipwrecks along the coast in the area. An automatic lighthouse was built on higher ground in 1973.

During the Victorian gold rushes around 1857, over 16,000 Chinese people landed at Robe to travel overland to the goldfields, as Victoria introduced a landing tax of £10 per person (more than the cost of their voyage) to reduce the number of Chinese immigrants. The immigrants then walked the 200 miles (320 km) to Ballarat and Bendigo.

Robe's importance decreased with the advent of railways which did not come to the town. It became a local service centre for the surrounding rural areas. It is still home to a fleet of fishing boats. Especially important are the local lobsters.

Heritage listings 

Robe has a number of heritage-listed sites, including:

 Burr Street: Robe Cemetery
 Cape Dombey: Cape Dombey Obelisk
 1A Hagen Street: Robe House
 2 Hagen Street: The Lady Star of the Sea Catholic Chapel and Schoolroom
 7 Karatta Road: Karatta House
 Main Road: Lakeside
 Main Road: Lakeside Stables and Coach House
 Main South Eastern Road: Richmond Park Homestead
 Millicent Road: Bush Inn
 2 Mundy Terrace: Robe Post Office and Telegraph Station
 Nora Creina Road: The Hermitage
 Nora Creina Road: CSIRO Field Research Station
 Nora Creina Road: Dingley Dell (dwelling)
 Nora Creina Road: Bellevue Homestead
 Obelisk Road: Robe Gaol Ruins
 Royal Circus: Royal Circus and Slipwall
 1 Royal Circus: Robe Customs House
 Smillie Street: Robe Institute
 Smillie Street: Criterion Hotel
 8 Smillie Street: Robe Courthouse, Police Station, Old Cells and Stables
 10 Smillie Street: Ormerod Cottages
 24 Smillie Street: Bank of South Australia Building
 26 Smillie Street: Campbell's Shop
 32 Smillie Street: Davison's Shop and Residence
 38 Smillie Street: Graymasts
 4-8 Sturt Street: Moorakyne House
 15 Sturt Street: Granny Banks' Cottage
 1 Victoria Street: Caledonian Inn
 5 Victoria Street: Wilson's Saddlery
 18 Victoria Street: Attic House

Environment

Climate
Robe experiences a warm-summer mediterranean climate (Köppen: Csb, Trewartha: Csbl), with warm, dry summers; mild, relatively dry springs and autumns; and mild winters with moderate precipitation.

See also

 Little Dip Conservation Park
 Lake Hawdon System Important Bird Area
 Woakwine Conservation Park

References

Further reading
Susan Marsden (1985) A glimpse of golden days, District Council of Robe: Robe.

External links
District Council of Robe
South Australian History – Robe

Coastal towns in South Australia
Limestone Coast
Fishing communities in Australia